The discography for American country music singer Tom T. Hall consists of 35 studio albums, nine compilation albums. and 50 singles.

Studio albums

1960s–1970s

1980s–2021

Compilation albums

Singles

1960s

1970s

1980s

Music videos

B-sides

Notes
A^ "I Love" also peaked at number 2 on the Billboard Hot Adult Contemporary Tracks chart and number 7 on the RPM Adult Contemporary Tracks chart in Canada.

References

See also 
:Category:Songs written by Tom T. Hall

Country music discographies
 
 
Discographies of American artists